The Fermanagh & Western Intermediate Cup was an intermediate soccer competition in Northern Ireland run by the Fermanagh & Western Football Association. It was introduced in 2009 as the first-ever intermediate competition within the Fermanagh & Western area, but discontinued after the 2011/12 season, the Fermanagh & Western Association citing a "general lack of interest by clubs".

List of finals

Summary of winners

See also
Steel & Sons Cup
Craig Memorial Cup
Bob Radcliffe Cup

References

Defunct association football cup competitions in Northern Ireland